Al Rajhi Bank Malaysia is a bank based in Malaysia. Its head office is located at Kuala Lumpur, Malaysia.

See also

Al-Rajhi Bank
List of banks
List of banks in Malaysia

References

Islamic banks of Malaysia